Walcott is a surname. Notable people with the surname include:

Arthur Walcott (1857–1934), a British actor of the silent era
Bess Bolden Walcott (1886–1988), African American educator, librarian, curator and activist
Charles Walcott (MP) (1733–1799), British politician
Charles Doolittle Walcott, American invertebrate paleontologist, discovered the Burgess Shale
Charles F. Walcott, American Union brevet brigadier general during the period of the American Civil War. 
Clyde Walcott (1926–2006), a West Indian cricketer
Collin Walcott (1945–1984), a North American musician.
Dennis Walcott, former Chancellor of the New York City Department of Education
Derek Walcott (1930–2017), Nobel laureate, poet, writer and artist of the post-colonial school of English language writing
Frederic C. Walcott (1869–1949), a United States Senator from Connecticut
George Walcott (1914–1964), American film actor
Gregory Walcott (1928–2015), American actor and producer
Harry Mills Walcott (1870–1944), a leading American painter and teacher of early 20th century
Jacob Walcott, an English footballer who plays for North Leigh
Jennifer Walcott, Playboy playmate
Jersey Joe Walcott (1914–1994), born Arnold Raymond Cream, a world heavyweight boxing champion - often compared to former world welterweight champion Barbados Joe Walcott, thus nicknamed Jersey Joe Walcott
Joe Walcott (1873–1935), boxer from British Guiana, a world welterweight champion
Keshorn Walcott, Trinidadian javelin thrower
Leslie Walcott (1894–1984),  a West Indian cricketer who played for Barbados 
Mary Vaux Walcott (1860–1940), an American artist and naturalist
 Richard Irving Walcott (1933– ), New Zealand geologist known for his work on plate tectonics
 Robert John Walcott (1839–1875), Attorney-General of Western Australia (1870-1872), Chief Justice of British Honduras (1872–1875)
Roderick Walcott (1930–2000), a St Lucian playwright, screenwriter, painter and theatre director
Sir Stephen Walcott (1807–1887), Commissioner of the U.K. Government Emigration Board
Theo Walcott, an English footballer who plays for Southampton
Yasmine Lyndell Walcott, Miss St. Lucia in 1994 and Consul General of St. Lucia in Martinique
William Walcot (1874–1943), a British architect graphic artist and etcher, notable as a practitioner of refined Art Nouveau